Before I Wake is a 1955 British mystery film directed by Albert S. Rogell and starring Mona Freeman, Jean Kent and Maxwell Reed. It was shot at Walton Studios in Surrey, with sets designed by the art director Scott MacGregor. It was released in the United States under the alternative title of Shadow of Fear. This was director Rogell's final film.

Synopsis
Returning home to England from the United States following news of her father's sudden death in a boating accident, April Haddon meets her stepmother Florence for the first time. The former nurse of her mother, she had married April's father after her death. April finds that in the few years she has been away her stepmother has completely changed the house, the old furnishings replaced with modernist art and the old family housekeepers replaced by a maid with loyalty to her new mistress. When her father's will is read, it becomes clear that the redrawn will Florence had been expecting had never been completed and the old will still stands, leaving most of his inheritance to April in three weeks when she turns twenty one. Convinced that Florence intends to murder her first, April turns to an old friend the local doctor to help her.

Cast
 Mona Freeman as April Haddon 
 Jean Kent as Florence Haddon 
 Maxwell Reed as Michael Elder 
 Hugh Miller as Mr. Driscoll 
 Gretchen Franklin as Elsie 
 Frederick Leister as Dr. Elder 
 Alexander Gauge as Police sergeant 
 Josephine Middleton as  Mrs. Harrison 
 Frank Forsyth as Jack Storey 
 Stanley Van Beers as Harry 
 Frank Atkinson as Taxi driver 
 Philip Ray as Station master 
 Robert Sansom as Parson 
 Phyllis Cornell as Dr. Elder's receptionist

Critical reception
TV Guide gave the film 2/4 stars for a "Decent suspense mystery," concluding that "The strong point of the film is the credibility Kent gives the story."

References

External links
 
 

1955 films
1950s mystery films
British mystery films
1950s English-language films
Films directed by Albert S. Rogell
Films shot at Nettlefold Studios
United Artists films
Films set in England
1950s British films
British black-and-white films